Isleta Amphitheater is an outdoor amphitheater, located in Albuquerque, New Mexico.

The amphitheater opened in February 2000 as the Mesa del Sol Amphitheater. This was a part of Mesa del Sol, a planned community, currently under development in Albuquerque.
In December 2000, the local newspaper Albuquerque Journal purchased naming rights and the amphitheater was thus known as ABQ Journal Pavilion (or simply Journal Pavilion). During the 2009 concert season, the venue's lawn area was expanded, increasing the capacity from 12,000 to 15,000. In March 2010, Hard Rock Hotel and Casino Albuquerque purchased naming rights and the venue became known as The Pavilion. In 2013, the venue changed its name again, to Isleta Amphitheater.

See also
 List of contemporary amphitheatres
Live Nation

References

Amphitheaters in the United States
Music venues in New Mexico
Theatres in New Mexico
Buildings and structures in Albuquerque, New Mexico